The Telega is a right tributary of the river Teleajen in Romania. It discharges into the Teleajen in Plopeni. It flows through the villages Melicești, Telega, Mislea, Sârca, Scorțeni, Bordenii Mici,  Cocorăștii Mislii, Țipărești and Plopeni.

References

Rivers of Romania
Rivers of Prahova County